The 1947 Indiana Hoosiers football team was an American football team that represented the Indiana University in the 1947 Big Nine Conference football season. The team compiled a 5–3–1 record (2–3–1 in conference play), and finished in  tie for sixth place in the Big Ten Conference. The Hoosiers played their home games at Memorial Stadium in Bloomington, Indiana. The team was coached by Bo McMillin, in his 14th and final year as head coach of the Hoosiers. McMillin retired from his position as head coach at the end of the year.

Three Indiana players received honors from Associated Press (AP), United Press (UP), or International News Service (INS) on the 1947 All-Big Nine Conference football team: guard Howard Brown (AP-1, INS-1, UP-1); halfback George Taliaferro (AP-2, INS-2); and end Lou Mihajlovich (AP-2, INS-2).

Schedule

1948 NFL draftees
Three Indiana players were selected in the 1948 NFL Draft, as follows:

References

Indiana
Indiana Hoosiers football seasons
Indiana Hoosiers football